The 1984 Overseas Final was the fourth running of the Overseas Final as part of the qualification for the 1984 Speedway World Championship Final to be held at the Ullevi Stadium in Göteborg, Sweden. The 1984 Final was run on 8 July at Belle Vue in Manchester, England, and was the second last qualifying round for Commonwealth and American riders.

The top 10 riders qualified for the Intercontinental Final to be held at the Speedway Center in Vojens, Denmark. Lance King became the first American rider to win the Overseas Final, winning with an unbeaten 15 point maximum.

In heat 4 Jeremy Doncaster lifted and crashed into Les Collins (actually running over his head). Doncaster was excluded and despite the crash Collins continued after receiving medical attention.

1984 Overseas Final
15 July
 Manchester, Hyde Road
Qualification: Top 10 plus 1 reserve to the Intercontinental Final in Vojens, Denmark

References

See also
 Motorcycle Speedway

1984
World Individual
Overseas Final
International sports competitions in Manchester